Collywell Bay was a railway station constructed in 1913–14 to serve a planned branch line terminating at Seaton Sluice. Although the line was built, the station did not open and the branch line was abandoned in 1931. The station was demolished in 1964 and remained in place despite never being opened. The station was to have been the terminus of the never opened Collywell Bay Branch Line, which, intending to promote Seaton Sluice as a resort, chose a more appealing name for their line and station.

Services

References

Disused railway stations in Northumberland
Unbuilt railway stations in the United Kingdom
Former North Eastern Railway (UK) stations